Pohopoco Creek (locally known as Big Creek) is a tributary of the Lehigh River in Monroe and Carbon Counties in Pennsylvania in the United States. It was historically known as Heads Creek, Pocho Pochto Creek, Pohopoko Creek, and Poopoke Creek.

See also
List of rivers of Pennsylvania

References

External links
U.S. Geological Survey: PA stream gaging stations

Tributaries of the Lehigh River
Rivers of Pennsylvania
Rivers of Carbon County, Pennsylvania
Rivers of Monroe County, Pennsylvania